Churiwala is a 2001 Bangladeshi film directed by Shah Alam Kiran and stars Ferdous Ahmed and Soumitra Chatterjee in the lead roles. The film received National Film Award in three and Bachsas Awards in two categories.

Cast
 Ferdous Ahmed
 Madhumita
 Soumitra Chatterjee
 Shambhu Chatterjee 
 ATM Shamsuzzaman
Kharaj Mukherjee

Music
All songs were composed by Satya Saha and Gazi Mazharul Anwar penned the lyrics

Release
The film was first released in West Bengal, India. There it became the highest grosser Bengali movie in last give years. Then, it was released in Bangladesh on 25 May 2001.

Awards and mominations

References

bibliography

External links
 

2001 films
2000s Bengali-language films
Bengali-language Bangladeshi films
Films scored by Satya Saha